Russia competed at the World Games 2017 in Wroclaw, Poland, from 20 July 2017 to 30 July 2017. Russia has competed at the World Games since 1993, following the dissolution of the Soviet Union in 1991.

For Russia, the 2017 World Games were the most successful by number of medals and by medal weight. Russian sportspeople won 28 gold medals, 21 silver medals and 14 bronze medals, surpassing the previous record made in 2005 World Games in Duisburg, Germany.

Medalists

Competitors

Gymnastic

Rhythmic Gymnastics
Russia has qualified at the 2017 World Games:

Women's individual event  – 2 quotas

Trampoline
Russia has qualified at the 2017 World Games:

Men's Individual Double Mini Trampoline - 1 quota 
Men's Individual Tumbling - 1 quota 
Men's Synchronized Trampoline - 1 quota
Women's Individual Double Mini Trampoline - 1 quota
Women's Individual Tumbling - 1 quota
Women's Synchronized Trampoline - 1 quota

Muaythai
Russia has qualified at the 2017 World Games:

Men's -67 kg - (Magomed Zaykunov)
Men's -81 kg - (Surik Magakian)
Men's -91 kg - (Artem Vakhitov)

References 

Nations at the 2017 World Games
2017 in Russian sport
2017